Tricholoma griseoviolaceum is a mushroom of the agaric genus Tricholoma. It was described as new to science in 1996.

The flesh is whitish gray. The spores are white. The odor and taste resemble cucumbers. Its edibility is unknown.

Similar species include Tricholoma atroviolaceum, T. portentosum, and T. virgatum.

See also
List of North American Tricholoma
List of Tricholoma species

References

griseoviolaceum
Fungi described in 1996
Fungi of North America